George Dyer (1755–1841) was an English classicist, poet and editor.

Life

He was educated at Christ's Hospital, and attended Emmanuel College, Cambridge. He edited the Delphin Classics, a 143-volume set of Latin works published by Abraham John Valpy at which task his editorial labors were so excessive as to induce near total blindness.  He also wrote poetry, and authored a number of tracts on the plight of England's poor and on reform of the political system.

Radical

He shared many ideas with radical writers of the time. His doctrine of benevolence advised a moral obligation to the poor, during a time when the interest in the lower classes was subsiding. He influenced authors such as William Godwin, but also gave critical and moral support to Samuel Taylor Coleridge and William Wordsworth.

Nicholas Roe's chapter on Dyer in The politics of nature: Wordsworth and some contemporaries shows Dyer to have been an important model for Wordsworth and Coleridge in the way he brought politics to bear on the poetry of nature and imagination. Dyer's influence represents, for Roe the answer to current historians who believe that the Romantics turned their backs on history in their search for a transcendent nature. The poet thus seems to have revenged himself on claims of insignificance.

Anecdotes

There are a number of stories associated with George Dyer, particularly regarding his myopia and his eccentricities. These stories were told by his friends James Henry Leigh Hunt and Charles Lamb. Lamb in his Elia essay Amicus Redivivus relates an incident in which Dyer, after a visit to the Lamb household in Islington, walked the wrong way on the pathway and went right into the New River, nearly drowning himself in the process. Leigh Hunt tells a similar story regarding Dyer, in which after spending the evening at the Hunts' for dinner, he inadvertently left with only one shoe. Apparently Dyer's missing shoe went unnoticed by him until he arrived home and he returned to the Hunt household after midnight, awakening everyone, to retrieve his missing shoe which was finally located under a table.

Another incident relating to Dyer concerns a preface which he wrote for his Poems published in 1802. On rereading one of the first prints of his book, Dyer claimed that there was a significant error in reasoning contained on the first page of the preface. He rushed to the printer and had a number of prints redone at considerable expense.

Works

Compositions by George Dyer include:  
 Poems (London, 1792)
 Complaints of the Poor People of England (London 1793)
 Poems and Critical Essays (London, 1802)
 History of the University and Colleges of Cambridge (two volumes, London, 1814)
 Privileges of the University of Cambridge (London, 1824)

References

Attribution

English non-fiction writers
1755 births
1841 deaths
People educated at Christ's Hospital
Alumni of Emmanuel College, Cambridge
English male poets
English male non-fiction writers